Heinrich Dreber, known as Franz-Dreber (9 January 1822, in Dresden – 3 August 1875, in Anticoli Corrado), was a German landscape painter.

Biography
Living in the house of a relation whose name Franz he adopted, he frequented the Academy of his native city, and afterwards the studio of Ludwig Richter. After he had gained the gold medal, he resided for some time in Munich, and in the spring of 1843 went as exhibitioner of the Dresden Academy to Rome, where he became a member of the Academy of St. Luke, and spent almost the entire remainder of his life. His study of Italian nature had the greatest influence on his works, and at the same time the impression made upon him by modern French landscape painters increased his desire to obtain a soft fusion of colours.

He died in Anticoli di Campagna, near Rome, in 1875. His pictures, which were exhibited together in 1876 in the National Gallery at Berlin, are with few exceptions in the hands of private persons; there are two in the Berlin Gallery — a 'Landscape, with the Hunting of Diana,' and 'An Autumn Morning in the Sabine Mountains.'

References

External links

German landscape painters
1822 births
1875 deaths
Artists from Dresden
Painters from Rome
19th-century German painters
19th-century German male artists
German male painters